Gertrud Meili-Dworetzki (1912 in Danzig-9 April 1995 in Bern) was a Swiss psychologist.

Life
She attended lectures from Horkheimer and Adorno, Mannheim and Tillich for one year. After 1933 she studied psychology in Bern and Geneva. Meili-Dworetzki promoted and dealt with the connection between psychology and philosophy in numerous specialist articles and books. After her husband, Richard Meili, with whom she had two sons, had been appointed to the Chair of Psychology at the University of Bern in 1949, she became his co-worker. She also translated from English and French.

Works
Johanna Schopenhauer, Verlag Droste, 1987, 
Spielarten des Menschenbildes: ein Vergleich der Menschenzeichnungen japanischer und schweizerischer Kinder, Verlag Huber, 1982, 
Das Bild des Menschen in der Vorstellung und Darstellung des Kleinkindes, Verlag Huber, 1957
Lust und Angst: Regulative Momente in der Persönlichkeitsentwicklung zweier Brüder, Verlag Huber, 1959
Heimatort Freie Stadt Danzig, Verlag Droste, 1985, 
Translations
Sigmund Freud, Leben und Werk: Die letzte Phase : 1919 - 1939, Ernest Jones, Dt. Taschenbuch-Verlag, 1984
Jahre der Reife, 1901-1919, Band 2 von Das Leben und Werk von Sigmund Freud, Autoren Ernest Jones, Katherine Jones, Verlag Huber, 1982,

References

Swiss psychologists
Swiss women psychologists
1912 births
1995 deaths
Psychologists from Gdańsk
People from West Prussia
20th-century psychologists
German emigrants to Switzerland